The North Dakota Insurance Commissioner regulates the insurance industry in North Dakota, United States, licenses insurance professionals in the state, educates consumers about different types of insurance, and handles consumer complaints. The current Insurance Commissioner is Jon Godfread who was elected in 2016.

History
Since the creation of the office with the state's constitution in 1889, the state has seen a total of 22 Insurance Commissioners. The commissioners have served relatively short terms when compared with North Dakota's other state offices; the longest tenure was that of Sveinung A. Olsness who served for 18 years, and the average time in office has been about 6 years. The office has been held by the North Dakota Republican Party for a wide majority of its existence; only four of the 22 Insurance Commissioners were from the state's Democratic Party. The Insurance Commissioner originally served a two-year term, but this was extended to four in 1964 by a constitutional amendment.

See also
List of North Dakota Insurance Commissioners

Notes

External links

 
1889 establishments in North Dakota